Franzenheim is a municipality in the Trier-Saarburg district, in Rhineland-Palatinate, Germany. 

It was first mentioned in a document of 1098, and was, until the end of the 18th century an independent entity belonging to the cathedral chapter of Trier.

References

Municipalities in Rhineland-Palatinate
Trier-Saarburg